This is a list of airports in Gabon, sorted by location.



List

See also 
 Transport in Gabon
 List of airports by ICAO code: F#FO – Gabon
 Wikipedia: WikiProject Aviation/Airline destination lists: Africa#Gabon

References

External links 
 Great Circle Mapper
 Aircraft Charter World
 World Aero Data

Gabon
 
Airports
Airports
Gabon